Placerias (meaning 'broad body') is an extinct genus of dicynodonts that lived during the Carnian to the Norian age of the Triassic Period (230–220 million years ago). Placerias belongs to a group of dicynodonts called Kannemeyeriiformes, which was the last known group of dicynodonts before the taxon became extinct at the end of the Triassic.

Description 

There are possible ecological and evolutionary parallels with the modern hippopotamus, spending much of its time during the wet season wallowing in the water, chewing at bankside vegetation. Remaining in the water would also have given Placerias some protection against land-based predators such as Postosuchus. Placerias used its beak to slice through thick branches and roots with two short tusks that could be used for defence and for intra-specific display. Placerias was closely related to Ischigualastia and similar in appearance.

Discovery 
 
Fossils of forty Placerias were found near St. Johns, southeast of the Petrified Forest in the Chinle Formation of Arizona. This site has become known as the 'Placerias Quarry' and was discovered in 1930, by Charles Camp and Samuel Welles, of the University of California, Berkeley. Sedimentological features of the site indicate a low-energy depositional environment, possibly flood-plain or overbank. Bones are associated mostly with mudstones and a layer that contains numerous carbonate nodules. It is also known from the Pekin Formation of North Carolina.

Placerias was originally considered the last of the Dicynodonts until fossil finds from Queensland were reported in 2003 to have revealed that the Dicynodonts survived until the Early Cretaceous. Agnolin et al. (2010) called for a reconsideration of that Australian specimen, noting its similarity to baurusuchian crocodyliforms such as Baurusuchus pachecoi. The Cretaceous dicynodont specimen was eventually discovered to belong to a specimen of Diprotodon instead. Another dicynodont (Lisowicia) have also survived into the Rhaetian

See also 
 List of therapsids
 Ischigualastia

References

External links 
 Walking with Dinosaurs – Fact File: Placerias
 Dinosaur and Paleontology Dictionary: Placerias
 Walking with Dinosaurs website

Anomodont genera
Kannemeyeriiformes
Carnian genera
Late Triassic synapsids
Triassic synapsids of North America
Triassic Arizona
Fossils of the United States
Chinle fauna
Fossil taxa described in 1904
Taxa named by Frederic Augustus Lucas